is a retired Japanese artistic gymnast. She placed fourth with the Japanese team at the 1960 Summer Olympics, while her best individual result was 15th place on uneven bars.

References

1937 births
Living people
Gymnasts at the 1960 Summer Olympics
Olympic gymnasts of Japan
Japanese female artistic gymnasts
20th-century Japanese women